Govindapally is a small town and panchayat in Malkangiri district of Odisha state in India. It comes under the Khairput block. It is at the entrance of Malkangiri district. It has the Biju Pattnaik College of Education and a Government Higher Secondary School with +2 science and commerce wings. The higher Secondary School is fully residential and is managed by the St. and Sc. development Department of Odisha. Apart from this educational institutions there are also two primary school. A primary health centre, a police outpost and an Agriculture Development office, PWD office, veterinary are some other establishments of this locality.

Cities and towns in Malkangiri district